Derazlu (also Romanized as Derāzlū and Darazalū; also known as Dahrehzalū and Derezelu) is a village in Tula Rud Rural District, in the Central District of Talesh County, Gilan Province, Iran. At the 2006 census, its population was 394, in 78 families.

References 

Populated places in Talesh County